Yagurg (also Romanized as Yagūrg; also known as Yūrek and Yūrg) is a village in Quri Chay-ye Gharbi Rural District, Saraju District, Maragheh County, East Azerbaijan Province, Iran. At the 2006 census, its population was 72, in 15 families.

References 

Towns and villages in Maragheh County